John Johnson House may refer to:

John Johnson House (Leighton, Alabama), listed on the NRHP in Colbert County, Alabama
John G. Johnson (Rintakangas) Homestead, Lake Fork, Idaho, listed on the NRHP in Valley County, Idaho
John S. Johnson (Sampila) Homestead, Lake Fork, Idaho, listed on the NRHP in Valley County, Idaho
John and Edward Johnson Three-Decker, Worcester, Massachusetts, listed on the NRHP in Massachusetts
John Johnson Three-Decker, Worcester, Massachusetts, listed on the NRHP in Massachusetts
John B. Johnson House, Osakis, Minnesota, listed on the NRHP in Douglas County, Minnesota
John A. Johnson House, St. Peter, Minnesota, listed on the NRHP in Nicollet County, Minnesota
John Johnson Farm, Hiram, Ohio, listed on the NRHP in Ohio
John Hiram Johnson House, Saluda, North Carolina, listed on the NRHP in Polk County, North Carolina
John Johnson House (Philadelphia, Pennsylvania), a U.S. National Historic Landmark and NRHP-listed
John Johnson House (McKinney, Texas), listed on the NRHP in Collin County, Texas
John A. and Annie C. Olsen Johnson House, Sandy, Utah, listed on the NRHP in Salt Lake County, Utah
John Johnson Saloon, Eau Claire, Wisconsin, listed on the NRHP in Eau Claire County, Wisconsin

See also
Johnson House (disambiguation)